Gurnam Singh (25 February 1899 – 31 May 1973) was an Indian politician and the Chief Minister of Punjab from 8 March 1967 to 25 November 1967, and again between 17 February 1969 to 27 March 1970. He was the first Shiromani Akali Dal Chief minister of Punjab. His ministry fell due to defection of Lachhman Singh Gill, who became the next Chief Minister with the support of the Indian National Congress. He died in an air crash in Delhi on 31 May 1973.

Early life
Singh was born in Narangwal, Ludhiana on 25 February 1899 in a Grewal Jatt family. He graduated from the Forman Christian College, Lahore. He captained the hockey team of Punjab University.

Law career
Singh practiced Law in Lyallpur (Present day Faisalabad, Pakistan). Later he served as the president of the Bar Association, there. During the partition of Punjab, Singh moved to Punjab, India. He was made the judge of the PEPSU and Punjab High Courts in 1950. He retired from this post in 1959.

Political career
In 1959, he joined Shiromani Akali Dal. In 1962, he became the member of Punjab Vidhan Sabha from Raikot. He defeated congress candidate Inder Mohan Singh. Akali Dal president Sant Fateh Singh made Gurnam Singh the head of the legislative wing of the party. He served as the leader of opposition in Punjab Vidhan Sabha from 1962 to 1967. In 1967, he won from Qila Raipur constituency, which he defended in 1969 too. In 1967 he became the first non-Congress Chief Minister of Punjab of Punjab. He led a coalition government of Akali Dal, Jana Sangh and communists.  However, his government could not complete the full term. He again became chief minister in 1969. Later he served as High Commissioner of India in Canberra, Australia.

Death
Singh died in an air crash in Delhi on 31 May 1973.

References

1899 births
1973 deaths
 Singh, Gurnam
Punjabi people
Punjab, India MLAs 1967–1972
People from Ludhiana district
Punjab, India MLAs 1962–1967
Victims of aviation accidents or incidents in India
Chief ministers from Shiromani Akali Dal
Shiromani Akali Dal politicians
High Commissioners of India to Australia